Alien Legion is a science-fiction comic-book series and associated titles created by Carl Potts, Alan Zelenetz, and Frank Cirocco for Marvel Comics's Epic Comics imprint in 1983. It features a military unit, Force Nomad, similar to the French Foreign Legion. 

Within the Marvel Comics Multiverse, the Alien Legion Universe is designated as Earth-98140.

Development 
Alien Legion — cover-titled The Alien Legion for its first series and initial graphic novel — features a military unit, Force Nomad, similar to the French Foreign Legion. Its characters include leader Sarigar, whose lower half is serpentine, the fully humanoid Torie Montroc, and Jugger Grimrod, an alien of the Thraxian race.

Carl Potts began developing the character designs and structure of Alien Legion as a sample of his artwork when he was attempting to break into the comics field. He chose to develop an original story and characters to stand out from the competition when submitting to editors. 

Potts returned to the concept in 1983 after joining Marvel Comics, and the series was pitched as a part of the Marvel Universe. Jim Shooter, then Editor-in-Chief of Marvel, approved the idea and Potts began development on the series under Marvel's contract which guaranteed profit participation for new characters. After Shooter withdrew his permission for the series, Archie Goodwin extended an offer to launch Alien Legion under the Epic Comics imprint.

Publication history
Potts and co-creators Alan Zelenetz (writer) and Frank Cirocco (penciler) completed development of series, and the franchise debuted with Marvel/Epic Comics' The Alien Legion #1-20 (cover-dated April 1984 - June 1987). The 18-issue Alien Legion (Oct. 1987 - Aug. 1990), minus "The", followed, generally scripted by Chuck Dixon and penciled by Larry Stroman. Afterward came the three-issue Dixon-Stroman miniseries Alien Legion: On The Edge (Nov. 1990 - Jan. 1991); the two-issue Dixon-Stroman Alien Legion: Tenants of Hell (1991); the one-shot cover-titled Alien Legion: Grimrod and copyrighted Alien Legion: Jugger Grimrod (Aug. 1992), by Dixon and artist Mike McMahon; the single-issue Alien Legion: Binary Deep (Sept. 1993), by Dixon and Argentine artist Enrique Alcatena; and the three-issue miniseries Alien Legion: One Planet at a Time (April–July 1993), by Dixon and penciler Hoang Nguyen.

Additionally, Marvel/Epic published two spinoffs: Marvel Graphic Novel #25 (cover-titled Marvel Graphic Novel: The Alien Legion), released in 1986 and containing the story "A Grey Day To Die" by writers Potts and Zelenetz, penciler Cirocco, and the first series' regular inker, Terry Austin; and the one-shot crossover with another series Law Dog and Grimrod: Terror at the Crossroads (1993).

As well, two short stories appeared: the 10-page "Tough Enough", by writer Dixon and penciler Douglas Braithwaite, in the Marvel/Epic magazine Epic (cover-titled Epic: An Anthology) #3 (1992); and the 12-page "Altered State", by writer Potts and artist Alcatena, in Heavy Hitters Annual #1 (1993).

Dark Horse Comics announced it was publishing a new Alien Legion series in 2010  but the series was delayed. Instead of being produced by Dark Horse, the new four-issue series, Uncivil War, was published in 2014 by Titan Comics. The new series was co-plotted by Potts and Dixon, scripted by Dixon, with art by Stroman and Potts.

The Alien Legion series of comics was the longest-running property to emerge from the Epic Comics line.

Collected editions
Some of the stories have been published in trade paperback and hardback form.

Alien Legion: Slaughterworld (1991), collects The Alien Legion #1 & 7-11.

Checker Book Publishing released the books Force Nomad and Piecemaker, collecting the second series, and Footsloggers, collecting the first six issues of the first volume. Titan Books published trade paperbacks of the On the Edge and Tenants of Hell miniseries.

Dark Horse Comics published the Alien Legion Omnibus Volume 1 in December 2009, collecting the first seven story arcs of the original Epic Comics series; and Alien Legion Omnibus Volume 2 in May 2010, rounding out the first series including the graphic novel.

Titan Comics began publishing omnibus collections of the original Epic Comics material in 2014. A collected hardcover edition of Uncivil War was published by Titan in February 2015.

TV and film attempts
In 1995, Potts wrote a screenplay for an Alien Legion television adaptation, which was optioned in 1996 by MGM. Bob Gale (screenwriter of Back to the Future) wrote the pilot script. After MGM stopped development of the series, the property was then optioned by Dimension Films, but the series was cancelled due to management changes. Alien Legion was later developed by Mainframe Studios, who was seeking another science fiction property after ReBoot, and Potts was hired as executive editor to develop the animated version.

Through his friendship with producer Boaz Yakin, which began with their collaboration on early drafts of the first Punisher film, Potts' Alien Legion screenplay was optioned in 2009 by producer Jerry Bruckheimer and The Walt Disney Company. In 2010, Bruckheimer exercised the option, buying the screenplay and assigning Game of Thrones show runner David Benioff to do a rewrite. Benioff, who was a fan of the comic series as a child, completed three drafts of the script before he was removed from the project. Potts introduced Tim Miller to the producers, who then declined the project due to creative differences with Disney. Potts states that he is continuing to develop Alien Legion with other partners.

References

External links
 (Official site)
 Carl Potts at the Lambiek Comiclopedia

Defunct American comics